Ranaghat Lok Sabha constituency is one of the 543 parliamentary constituencies in India. The constituency is in Nadia district in West Bengal. As per order of the Delimitation Commission in respect of the boundary delimitation of constituencies in the West Bengal, from 2009 Nabadwip Lok Sabha constituency ceased to exist and a new one came into being: Ranaghat Lok Sabha constituency. All seven assembly segments of No. 13 Ranaghat Lok Sabha constituency are in Nadia district.

Assembly segments

Ranaghat (SC) Lok Sabha constituency (parliamentary constituency no. 13) is composed of the following assembly segments:

Members of Parliament

For MPs from this area in previous years see Nabadwip Lok Sabha constituency

Election results

17th Lok Sabha: 2019 General Elections

General election 2014

General election 2009

References

See also
 List of Constituencies of the Lok Sabha

Lok Sabha constituencies in West Bengal
Politics of Nadia district